Interleukin-22 (IL-22) is protein that in humans is encoded by the IL22 gene.

Structure 

IL-22 is an α-helical cytokine. IL-22 binds to a heterodimeric cell surface receptor composed of IL-10R2 and IL-22R1 subunits. IL-22R is expressed on tissue cells, and it is absent on immune cells.

Crystallization is possible if the N-linked glycosylation sites are removed in mutants of IL-22 bound with high-affinity cell-surface receptor sIL-22R1. The crystallographic asymmetric unit contained two IL-22-sIL-22R1 complexes.

Function 

IL-22 is produced by several populations of immune cells at a site of inflammation. Producers are αβ T cells classes Th1, Th22 and Th17 along with γδ T cells, NKT, ILC3, neutrophils and macrophages. IL-22 takes effect on non-hematopoietic cells – mainly stromal and epithelial cells. Effects involve stimulation of cell survival, proliferation and synthesis of antimicrobials including S100, Reg3β, Reg3γ and defensins. IL-22 thus participates in both wound healing and in protection against microbes. IL-22 dysregulation takes part in pathogenesis of several autoimmune diseases like systemic lupus erythematosus, rheumatoid arthritis and psoriasis.   

IL-22 biological activity is initiated by binding to a cell-surface complex composed of IL-22R1 and IL-10R2 receptor chains and further regulated by interactions with a soluble binding protein, IL-22BP, which shares sequence similarity with an extracellular region of IL-22R1 (sIL-22R1). IL-22 and IL-10 receptor chains play a role in cellular targeting and signal transduction to selectively initiate and regulate immune responses. IL-22 can contribute to immune disease through the stimulation of inflammatory responses, S100s and defensins.  IL-22 also promotes hepatocyte survival in the liver and epithelial cells in the lung and gut similar to IL-10. In some contexts, the pro-inflammatory versus tissue-protective functions of IL-22 are regulated by the often co-expressed cytokine IL-17A

Target tissue 

Targets of this cytokine are mostly non-hematopoietic cells – epithelial and stromal cells of following tissues and organs: liver, lung, skin, thymus, pancreas, kidney, gastrointestinal tract, synovial tissues, heart, breast, eye and adipose tissue.

Signaling 

IL-22 is a member of a group of cytokines called the IL-10 family or IL-10 superfamily (including IL-19, IL-20, IL-24, and IL-26), a class of potent mediators of cellular inflammatory responses. It shares use of IL-10R2 in cell signaling with other members of this family, IL-10, IL-26, IL-28A/B and IL-29. 

IL-22, signals through the interferon receptor-related proteins CRF2-4 and IL-22R. It forms cell surface complexes with IL-22R1 and IL-10R2 chains resulting in signal transduction through receptor, IL-10R2. The IL-22/IL-22R1/IL-10R2 complex activates intracellular kinases (JAK1, Tyk2, and MAP kinases) and transcription factors, especially STAT3. It can induce IL-20 and IL-24 signaling when IL-22R1 pairs with IL-20R2.

Regulation of production 
IL-22 production is induced mainly through IL-23 receptor signalling. IL-23 is produced by dendritic cells after recognition of ligands by specific Toll-like receptors especially in combination with Dectin-1 and or NOD2 signalling. IL-1β stimulates IL-22 production too. On the other hand IL-22 binding protein is a soluble inhibitor which blocks receptor binding site of IL-22.

References

Further reading 

 
 
 
 
 
 
 
 
 
 
 
 
 
 
 
 
 
 
 
 

Interleukins